New Jerusalem is a feature film directed, co-written, and co-produced by Rick Alverson that premiered in 2011 at the 40th International Film Festival Rotterdam and in the United States at SXSW. Independent music label Jagjaguwar executive produced and funded the film.

Plot
The film focuses on the relationship between an Irish immigrant (Colm O'Leary), a veteran of the U.S. war in Afghanistan, and his American co-worker, an evangelical Christian (Will Oldham).

References

2011 films
2011 drama films
American drama films
2010s English-language films
2010s American films